Phil Wood (born 29 December 1953) was a New Zealand triple jump competitor who still holds the current national triple jump record of 16.22 m. He won four national titles in the triple jump.

Personal bests

References

External links

Living people
1953 births
New Zealand male triple jumpers
Athletes (track and field) at the 1978 Commonwealth Games
Commonwealth Games competitors for New Zealand